In re Citigroup Inc Shareholder Derivative Litigation, 964 A 2d 106 (Del Ch 2009) is a US corporate law case, concerning the standard under Delaware law for the duty of loyalty among directors' duties.

Facts
Citigroup had losses from subprime debt markets, as part of the Global Financial Crisis which began in 2007. Before the crash, former CEO Chuck Prince said 'as long as the music is still playing you have to get up and dance'. Shareholders of Citigroup claimed that the directors had breached their duty of care by (1) failing to monitor the bank's risk profile and (2) failing to control risk taking by the bank. They alleged there were 'red flags' from public statements like Paul Krugman in the NY Times (27 May 2005) saying there were 'feverish stages of a speculative bubble' and Ameriquest Mortgage (May 2006) closing 229 offices and dismissing 3800 employees.

Judgment
Chancellor Chandler held that there was no liability without bad faith. He repeated the In re Caremark International Inc. Derivative Litigation standard of 'utter failure' establishing a lack of good faith, which was approved further in Stone v. Ritter. As he said, the business judgment rule,

See also

United States corporate law
Re Barings plc (No 5) [1999] 1 BCLC 433, [2000] 1 BCLC 523

Notes

References

United States corporate case law
Delaware state case law